Hüdavendigâr Eyalet was an eyalet of the Ottoman Empire. The word Hüdavendigâr comes from the Persian word Khodāvandgār which literally translates to "devotee of god".

Administrative divisions
The eyalet was subdivided into 8 sanjaks:

 Sanjak of Hüdavendigâr (Bursa)
 Sanjak of Karahisar-i Sahip
 Sanjak of Kütahya
 Sanjak of Bilecik
 Sanjak of Biga
 Sanjak of Karesi
 Sanjak of Erdek
 Sanjak of Ayvalık

References

Eyalets of the Ottoman Empire in Anatolia
1827 establishments in the Ottoman Empire
1867 disestablishments in the Ottoman Empire